John Lorin Parrella (born November 22, 1969) is an American football coach and former defensive tackle who is currently the Head Coach at Lutheran West High School in Rocky River, OH. Parrella was the assistant defensive line coach for the Cleveland Browns of the National Football League (NFL) 2019. He previously served as the former defensive line coach for the University of Nebraska. He played college football at Nebraska and was drafted by the Buffalo Bills in the second round of the 1993 NFL Draft.

Playing career
Parrella played most of his career with the San Diego Chargers from 1994-2001. He proved to be a reliable defender on the interior as a defensive tackle starting in 1996, routinely finishing with more than 30 tackles a year through 2002.  His best seasons came in 1999 and 2000 when he recorded 5.5 and 7.0 Sacks along with 5 combined forced fumbles.  He also played for the Oakland Raiders from 2002-2004.  He would record 1 Sack with 41 tackles in 2002.

Coaching career

High School and College coaching
From 2009 to 2012, Parrella served as the head coach at Valley Christian High School.

In 2013, Parrella was hired as an assistant coach at Chabot College.

Parrella then served as the defensive line coach at Northern Michigan University from 2014 to 2015.

On February 22, 2016, Parrella was hired on at Nebraska to be their defensive line coach. Following the 2017 season, he was not retained when Scott Frost became Nebraska's head coach in December 2017.

Cleveland Browns
On January 18, 2019, Parrella was hired by the Cleveland Browns as an assistant defensive line coach.

References

1969 births
Living people
American football defensive tackles
Buffalo Bills players
Cleveland Browns coaches
High school football coaches in California
Nebraska Cornhuskers football coaches
Nebraska Cornhuskers football players
Northern Michigan Wildcats football coaches
Oakland Raiders players
Players of American football from Kansas
San Diego Chargers players
Sportspeople from Topeka, Kansas
Ed Block Courage Award recipients